LeDock is a simple proprietary molecular docking software that can be used for docking of ligands with protein target. LeDock supports running on 64-bit Linux, macOS, and 32-bit and 64-bit Windows.

Introduction 
LeDock is based on simulated annealing and evolutionary optimization of the ligand pose and its rotatable bonds, using a physics, knowledge-based scoring scheme derived from years of prospective virtual screening campaigns.

Performance 
LeDock had a good performance in a recent comprehensive evaluation of docking programs on a diverse set of 2002 protein-ligand complexes. It has high accuracy in pose prediction, saving calculating time, and user-friendly for both virtual screening and hit elaboration.

See also 
 Drug design           
 Macromolecular docking           
 Molecular mechanics         
 Molecular modelling         
 Protein structure
 Protein design        
 Software for molecular mechanics modeling                        
 List of protein-ligand docking software
 Molecular design software                                        
 Lead Finder                         
 Virtual screening
 Scoring functions for docking

References

External links 
 Official website

Medicinal chemistry
Drug discovery
Molecular modelling software